The archery competitions at the 2024 Summer Olympics in Paris are scheduled to run over a seven-day period, from 25 July to 4 August, at Les Invalides. 128 archers (64 for each gender) will compete across five events, with the successful mixed team recurve returning to the Olympic program for the second time.

Qualification

In the initial quarter of 2022, the International Olympic Committee and World Archery agreed to change the rules on the allocation of the Olympic quota places, ensuring the vast promotion of geographical universal opportunities for the archers around the world at the Games. A total of 128 quota places, with an equal distribution between men and women, will be awarded at the top-level global and continental meets.

Each National Olympic Committee (NOC) is permitted to enter a maximum of six archers, three per gender. NOCs that qualify for a gender-based team recurve can select three members to form a squad, ensuring that each of them must compete in the individual recurve. 

Twelve slots are available for each gender in the team recurve events, with thirty-six individuals competing against each other through a team-based qualification pathway. While three tickets remain available at the final qualifying meet, the number of quota places at the Worlds has been reduced to three that climb the podium. The other five tickets will be assigned instead to the continental team champions from Europe, Asia, and the Americas, and to the top two teams vying for qualification through the world rankings after the final qualifying meet.

Throughout the process, twenty-eight individual quota places will be awarded to the highest-ranked archers at the 2023 World Championships in Berlin, Germany, the continental Games (European Games, Asian Games, and the Pan American Games), whether mixed team champions or individual recurve gold medalists,  the standalone continental meets (Africa, Europe, Asia, Oceania, and the Americas), and at the final qualification tournament, scheduled for mid-2024.

Host nation France reserves three quota places each for the men's and women's events, along with the mixed team recurve, while four coveted spots are entitled to the eligible NOCs interested to have their archers compete in Paris 2024, as granted by the Universality principle.

Competition format 
A total of 128 athletes are expected to compete across the five events: the men's and women's individual recurve, the men's and women's team recurve, and the mixed team recurve, an event added to the program since Tokyo 2020.

All five events are scheduled to be recurve archery events, held under the World Archery-approved 70-meter distance and rules. The competition begins with an initial ranking round involving all 64 archers of each gender. Each archer will shoot a maximum of 72 arrows to be seeded from 1–64 according to their score. Aside from the individual marks, the ranking round will seed the men's and women's teams from 1 to 12, by aggregating the individual scores for the members of each team. Additionally, the ranking round is scheduled to determine the 16 pairs qualifying for the mixed team event (specifically, for the nations consisting of both a male and a female archer, the top men's score and the top women's score are combined), along with the top 16 seeds.

Each event is staged through a single-elimination tournament format, except for the semifinal losers, who played off to decide the bronze medal winner.

Individual events 
In the individual events, all 64 archers entered the competition in the first round. The draw is seeded based on the result of the ranking round, so the first seed shoots against the sixty-fourth seed in the initial round.

Each match will be scored through the Archery Olympic Round, consisting of the best-of-five sets, with three arrows per set. The winner of each set receives two points. If the scores in the set are tied, then each archer receives one point. If at the end of five sets the score is tied at 5–5, a single arrow shoot-off is held and the closest to the center will be declared the winner.

Men's and women's team events 
In the team events, the top four seeded teams from the ranking round will be advanced directly to the quarterfinal stage. The remaining eight teams, seeded fifth to twelfth, will contest against each other for the remaining half of the quarterfinal places.

The team event follows the same Archery Olympic Round set system, as the individual event, although each set consists of six arrows (two per team member) and only four sets are held.

Mixed team event 
In the mixed team event, the top 16 seeded teams from the ranking round will compete in a single-elimination bracket. Similar to the men's and women's team events, the set system uses two arrows per team member (which denotes four arrows per NOC in the mixed team) and four sets.

Participating nations

Medal summary

Medal table

Medalists

See also
Archery at the 2022 Asian Games
Archery at the 2023 European Games
Archery at the 2023 Pan American Games

References 

 
Archery at the Summer Olympics
2024 Summer Olympics events
Olympics
Olympics
Archery competitions in France